Ilias Tiendrébéogo is a Burkina Faso professional footballer, who plays as a forward for AS SONABEL and the Burkina Faso national football team.

International career
In January 2014, coach Brama Traore, invited him to be a part of the Burkina Faso squad for the 2014 African Nations Championship. The team was eliminated in the group stages after losing to  Uganda and Zimbabwe and then drawing with Morocco.

References

1992 births
Living people
Burkinabé footballers
Burkina Faso international footballers
2014 African Nations Championship players
AS SONABEL players
ASFA Yennenga players
Africa Sports d'Abidjan players
Burkinabé expatriate footballers
Expatriate footballers in Ivory Coast
Burkinabé expatriate sportspeople in Ivory Coast
Association football forwards
21st-century Burkinabé people
Burkina Faso A' international footballers
2020 African Nations Championship players